University of Medicine and Pharmacy at Ho Chi Minh City is one of the most highly ranked universities of medicine and pharmacy in Vietnam. It offers graduate and postgraduate education in medicine, pharmacy. The university has seven faculties and one hospital:

 Faculty of Fundamental Sciences
 Faculty of Medicine
 Faculty of Pharmacy
 Faculty of Traditional Medicine
 Faculty of Public Health
 Faculty of Nursing and Medical Technology
 Faculty of Odonto-Stomatology
 University Medical Center

History
Originally, the University of Medicine and Pharmacy at Ho Chi Minh City was a medical school that belonged to the University of Saigon, which was founded in 1947 by French colonists in the period of French Indochina. Professor C. Massias was the principal. It was at 28 Testard/Tran Quy Cap Street, District 3, Ho Chi Minh City (Vo Van Tan Street today). On 31 August 1961, under the authority of the government of the Republic of Vietnam the school was split into two: Saigon College of Medicine and Saigon College of Pharmacy. In 1964 Saigon College of Dentistry was founded from a division of the medical school.

In 1976 after the Vietnam War, the three schools were merged with a new name — Ho Chi Minh City University of Medicine and Pharmacy — by an authority from the Communist Party of Vietnam. The first head office had two floors for offices, a library, a meeting room for lectures, and three side-by-side houses for studying.

The practice areas for fundamental sciences and basic medicine were around Ho Chi Minh City such as Pasteur Institute (used to learn about parasitic, micro-organism), Human Body Institute (for anatomy), Saigon Hospital (for chemistry). The Installation of Human Body Institute was used to learn about histology, physiology, illness, and anatomy. Students of Medicine and Pharmacy studied at the main installation until 1961. The Faculty of Pharmacy was moved to Nam Ki Khoi Nghia Street.

November 16, 1966, the school was moved to Medicine Learning Center (Hong Bang Street, District 5) with a well-equipped system, facility, and students of Medicine and Dentistry have studied here up to date. It has the Main auditorium with 500 seats, three auditoriums with 300 seats each, a library, and labs.

On 27 October 1976, the government reorganized schools at Saigon University Institute. There were eight schools left including Collective University, Institute of Technology, University of Technical Education of Ho Chi Minh City, University of Medicine and Pharmacy at Ho Chi Minh City, University of Economics, University of Architecture, University of Agriculture, University of Pedagogy. Although the new name does not reflect the fact that the dental school is a branch of the university system, it has been officially used until today.

In 1990, there was a decision from the school and Ministry of Health to build four more faculties and one hospital:
 1994: Faculty of Fundamental Sciences
 1998: Faculty of Traditional Medicine and Medicine Technique and Convalescent Faculty
 1999: Faculty of Public Health
 2000: The university hospital

Managing board
 Chairman: Associate Professor Trần Diệp Tuấn MD, Ph.D.
 Vice Rector, President of the University Medical Center: Associate Professor Nguyễn Hoàng Bắc MD, Ph.D

References

External links

Official website

Universities in Ho Chi Minh City
Pharmacy schools
Medical schools in Vietnam